Sir Alexander Norman Ley Cater KCIE (15 June 1880 – 21 October 1957) was an administrator in British India.

Born at Lower Bebington, Cheshire, the son of Charles A. Cater, he was educated at Wellington College and Christ's College, Cambridge. He joined the ICS in 1903, arriving in India the following year. He later became a lieutenant in the Hyderabad Rifles. In 1921, he received the Order of the White Elephant, 3rd Class from the King of Siam. He was appointed a CIE in 1929 and was knighted with the KCIE in 1933. He served as Chief Commissioner of Balochistan during the 1930s.

References

1880 births
1957 deaths
Indian Civil Service (British India) officers
Knights Commander of the Order of the Indian Empire
People educated at Wellington College, Berkshire
Alumni of Christ's College, Cambridge
Indian Defence Force officers